St. Anthony School of Maui is a private, Roman Catholic high school in Wailuku, Hawaii in the Roman Catholic Diocese of Honolulu.

History
St. Anthony was established as a boys school in 1848 by the Sacred Heart Fathers. The Marianists (Society of Mary) took over in 1883. The Sisters of St. Francis of Syracuse established a girls School in 1884. The Girls and Boys schools merged in 1968.

St. Anthony Junior Senior High School Band
St. Anthony has symphonic, concert, marching/pep, jazz and ukulele bands. The musicians traveled to New York in April 2013 to perform in the National Band and Orchestra Festival at Carnegie Hall. The band recently took their second trip to Carnegie Hall. They also traveled to Washington D.C. to perform in the Festival of States.

Notable alumni
Anthony T. Kaho'ohanohano, 1949, U.S. Army Pfc. Medal of Honor (Korea)
Shane Victorino, outfielder for the Boston Red Sox

External links
 School Website

Notes and references

Catholic secondary schools in Hawaii
Marianist schools
Educational institutions established in 1848
Schools in Maui
Private K-12 schools in Hawaii
High schools in Maui
Roman Catholic Diocese of Honolulu
1848 establishments in Hawaii